"Farewell Blues" is a 1922 jazz standard written by Paul Mares, Leon Roppolo and Elmer Schoebel.

Background
The song was recorded on August 29, 1922, in Richmond, Indiana and released as Gennett 4966A, Matrix #11179, as by the Friars Society Orchestra under the direction of Husk O'Hara. It was first released by the New Orleans Rhythm Kings under the name the Friars Society Orchestra and soon was covered by several jazz bands. A band called The Georgians recorded it in 1923, copying Roppolo's acclaimed clarinet solo note for note.

Cover versions
Joe "King" Oliver – Sugar Foot Stomp (1928)
The Georgians (1923)
Gus Mulcay (1926)
The Charleston Chasers (1928)
Wingy Manone (1939)
Ted Lewis (1929)
Roy Smeck (1931)
Sol Hoopii (1938)
Abe Lyman (1932)
Henderson's Dance Players (1923)
Isham Jones Orchestra – Swinging Down the Lane (1930)
Cab Calloway – Kicking the Gong Around (1931)
Benny Carter – When the Lights Are Low (1936)
Woody Herman – Blues on Parade (1937)
Eddie Condon – Dixieland All Stars (1939)
Glenn Miller – On the Alamo (1941); V-Disc 334A; RCA Bluebird 10495B
Count Basie – Blues by Basie (1942); Columbia 36712
Django Reinhardt – Djangology (1948)
Danny Gatton – Redneck Jazz (1978)
Alan Munde (1980)
Accordéon Mélancolique – Gratitude (2012); Sterkenburg Records stam010

Notes

See also
List of 1920s jazz standards

1922 songs
1920s jazz standards
Dixieland jazz standards
Songs written by Elmer Schoebel
Cab Calloway songs